He Lover of Death is a novel by Russian author Boris Akunin. The book is a historical detective novel featuring the fictional character Erast Fandorin. The book was initially published in Russia in 2001. This is the ninth novel in the Erast Fandorin series The book was released in English by Weidenfeld and Nicolson in 2010.

Plot
The novel is set in year 1900. Erast Fandorin looks for a treasure hidden in a basement. The case involves a mysterious lady called Death, whose lovers die under strange circumstances.

References

External links
Erast Fandorin series official website

Fiction set in 1896
2001 novels
Novels by Boris Akunin
Novels set in Moscow
Weidenfeld & Nicolson books
21st-century Russian novels
Russian historical novels
Russian detective novels